Portoval  is a multi-purpose stadium in Novo Mesto, Slovenia. It is currently used mostly for football matches and is the home ground of NK Krka.

The stadium was built in 1958 and currently holds 1,500 spectators, 500 can be seated.

References

External links
Soccerway profile
Stadioni.org profile 

Football venues in Slovenia
Multi-purpose stadiums in Slovenia
Sports venues completed in 1958
1958 establishments in Slovenia